James Gilles (born 1962), better known as Jim Gilles or more commonly Brother Jim, is an American evangelist whose ministry is concentrated on college campuses and outdoor events.  He has preached on over 335 college and University campuses in 49 states and 6 countries. He has been engaged in several civil rights lawsuits challenging university and city attempts to stop or limit his preaching.

Lawsuits and rallies
Jim Gilles became a born again Christian while attending a Van Halen concert in Evansville, Indiana on November 7, 1980. Singer David Lee Roth declared to the crowd of 13,000 that "Not even God can save your soul at a Van Halen Concert." This statement was their introduction to their hit song "Runnin' with the Devil." This incident started his involvement with Christianity. His fundamentalist, Bible-believing Christian views frequently include preaching against drugs, sex, booze, and rock and roll.  This creates no small stir on today's college campuses.  Gilles has been arrested more than 30 times since 1982, while preaching, for various charges of disorderly conduct, disturbing the peace, loitering, unreasonable noise, and trespassing.

The first university that Jim Gilles sued was Virginia Tech.  Jim Gilles started the suit pro se and ended up with ACLU attorney James Patrick Wiseman from Austin, Texas.

Jim Gilles was also represented twice by John Reinstein, the ACLU Legal Director for Massachusetts.  The matters stemmed from arrests at both Bridgewater State University and Framingham State University .

The University of North Carolina, Greensboro paid Jim Gilles $10,000 plus attorney fees as a settlement for violating his civil rights. Murray State University changed their free speech policy after being sued by Jim Gilles .

Jim Gilles was arrested seven times in his hometown of Evansville, Indiana .  Most of those arrests occurred in the 1980s . The first six charges were either beaten by Gilles or dropped by Prosecution .  The seventh arrest was heard by a court administrator instead of a judge . The court administrator found Gilles guilty of "Unreasonable Noise" while he was preaching during a "Bierstube." This Bierstube took place  outside of the Old Court House, in vacant downtown Evansville, at around 10:30pm, on a weekend night.  Gilles would preach between songs so that he could be heard.  Gilles' attorneys encouraged him to appeal the decision pro se.  Gilles did and received a split written decision on his first appeal in the Indiana Court of Appeals .  Gilles appealed all of the way to the United States Supreme Court, where it was put on the docket.  The Supreme court denied cert.
Jim Gilles was arrested twice by Sergeant Greg Davis at Indiana University of Pennsylvania in Indiana, PA .  On the first arrest, Gilles represented himself and beat the University's charges.  On the second arrest, Gilles had an attorney help him to beat the University.  Then Gilles sued the University of Indiana Pennsylvania in Federal Court .

Jim Gilles was arrested twice at Northeastern Oklahoma State University in Tahlequah, OK.  Gilles represented himself in a day-long jury trial, and jury declared him "not guilty." 

In 2002, Gilles challenged Miami University, which had violated his First Amendment Rights by creating a policy that required all speakers to first secure sponsorship from a campus organization. The case was dismissed by a district court, then reinstated and remanded on appeal on the grounds that the district court should have investigated the fairness of the policy.

In 2004, Gilles filed a federal lawsuit challenging Xavier University.  Xavier University told Gilles that they owned the city sidewalk where Gilles was preaching. Xavier University lost that case and paid Gilles' attorney fees. He had also sued Vincennes University to be allowed to speak in front of the library. In 2007, Gilles and the Alliance Defense Fund appealed the 6th Circuit Court Ruling to the US Supreme Court but were denied certiorari.

In 2006, Gilles filed a federal lawsuit against Murray State University, alleging that Murray State deprived him of his rights to free speech when he was told that he would have to stop preaching until he secured sponsorship from a campus organization. Gilles contended that he had frequented Murray State since the 1980s and it never before required a sponsor. Gilles lost the lawsuit when the court ruled Murray State's speech policy requiring speakers to obtain on-campus sponsors is legal. However, he reached a settlement to be allowed to speak on the Murray State campus in November 2007.

In August 2016, Gilles and several others went to Cleveland, Ohio for the 2016 GOP convention.

References

1962 births
Living people
People from Evansville, Indiana
Campus preachers